Bhalsod is a surname found among people of India and its diaspora in other countries. The surname is largely found in people from Gujarat especially in Prajapati and Kumbhar caste of the State and its overseas diaspora in the United Kingdom. The people using last name Bhalsod are found also in United States of America, Australia. The surname is also found some other communities of Gujarat, like - Mestri and Kadia Kshatriya communities.

References

Surnames of Indian origin
Indian surnames